The Nayoro Main Line  was a rail line which was operated by Japanese National Railways and later under JR Hokkaido, which extended from Nayoro to Engaru, where it connected with the Sekihoku Main Line. It had a branch line known as the Yubetsu Line  which ran between Naka-Yubetsu and Yubetsu, and was originally a light rail line before it was converted in 1916.

The line opened in 1919 as the Nayoro Line , and was designated as a main line in 1923. It was designated as one of the specified local lines under the JNR Reconstruction Act, and the entire line was closed on May 1, 1989. The Nishi-Okoppe and Yubetsu stations are now the site of a hotel and fire station respectively.

Services 
In 1962, three services would start using the line - the Monbetsu, which ran between Sapporo and Engaru; the Asahikawa, which was a round trip service that made stops at Engaru and Nayoro before returning to Asahikawa; and the Tento, which ran between Okoppe and Abashiri.

Stations

Main Line

Yubetsu Line

History 
In 1915, the Yubetsu Light Rail Line was extended from Nokkeushi (which was renamed to Kitami in 1942) to Shanabuchi (later ). The light railroad lines of the national railroads were built with the same gauge of 1067mm as the other lines, but only the Yubetsu Light Rail Line had a gauge of 762mm. In the following year, the gauge was changed to 1067mm.

The section of the line from Nayoro to Naka-Yubetsu, on the other hand, was constructed from both sides as the Nayoro West Line and the Nayoro East Line to avoid the difficult Sekihoku and Kitami Passes, and the entire line was opened to traffic as the Nayoro Line between 1919 and 1921. In 1922, with the repeal of the Light Railways Act, the Yubetsu Light Rail Line was renamed to the Yubetsu Line, and in 1923, the Nayoro Line was designated as a main line, and was renamed to the Nayoro Main Line.

In 1932, after the Kitami Pass was overcome and the Sekihoku Line (later the Sekihoku Main Line) became fully operational, the section of the Yubetsu Line between Naka-Yubetsu and Nokkeushi would be transferred to other lines - the section between Engaru and Naka-Yubetsu became part of the Nayoro Main Line, whilst the section between Engaru and Nokkeushi became part of the Sekihoku Line.

Closure 
When the National Railways Restructuring Act was passed in 1980, the line was designated as a specified local line, but its abolition was delayed along with that of the Tempoku, Chihoku, and  lines due to insufficient alternative transportation at that time, especially in winter. However, in 1985, the approval was given for their abolition as the problem had been fixed.

After the privatization of Japan National Railways in April 1987, the towns of Engaru, Monbetsu, and Shimokawa along the line continued to campaign for the continuation of the line by subsidizing the use of the line by their residents. It was proposed that the sections of the line between Nayoro and Shimokawa and between Monbetsu and Engaru be transferred to third-sector operation, as these sections were used most frequently by passengers. However, the idea of continuing the line as a railroad was eventually abandoned, and the entire line was closed to passengers on April 30, 1989.

References

External links

Rail transport in Japan
Rail transport in Hokkaido
Defunct railroads